Johann Michael Bauer (24 November 1895 – 15 February 1943) was a highly decorated Oberst in the Wehrmacht during World War II. He was also a recipient of the Knight's Cross of the Iron Cross. The Knight's Cross of the Iron Cross was awarded to recognise extreme battlefield bravery or successful military leadership. Michael Bauer suffered a stroke on 3 February 1943 and died on 15 February 1943 in Sclobodka, Russia.

Awards and decorations 
 Iron Cross (1914)
 2nd Class (22 October 1914)
 1st Class (23 September 1918)
 Wound Badge (1914)
 in Black
 Honour Cross of the World War 1914/1918 
 Clasp to the Iron Cross (1939)
 2nd Class (29 June 1940)
 1st Class (2 July 1940)
 German Cross in Gold on 26 December 1941 as Major in the III./Infanterie-Regiment 499
 Knight's Cross of the Iron Cross on 2 February 1942 as Major and commander of the I./Infanterie-Regiment 499

References

Citations

Bibliography

External links 
 TracesOfWar.com
 Ritterkreuztraeger 1939-1945

1895 births
1943 deaths
People from Herzogenaurach
People from the Kingdom of Bavaria
German Army personnel of World War I
Recipients of the Gold German Cross
Recipients of the Knight's Cross of the Iron Cross
Recipients of the clasp to the Iron Cross, 1st class
German Army personnel killed in World War II
Military personnel from Bavaria